Jesdaporn Pholdee (born June 5, 1977 or nickname Tik) is a Thai actor, model, and presenter.

Biography

Early life and education 
Jesdaporn Pholdee is the eldest of three brothers; he has two younger brothers. His brother Pichetchai Pholdee is also actor. He completed his high school education at Yothinburana and graduated with a bachelor's degree from the Industrial Department of the Faculty of Engineering at the University of the Thai Chamber of Commerce. He was conferred an Honorary Degree of Doctor of Science in environmental science and natural resources from the Faculty of Science and Technology at Rajamangala University of Technology Phra Nakhon on December 16, 2014.

Career 
Jesdaporn Pholdee entered the entertainment industry while he was studying at the University as a presenter for television commercials and in still pictures for advertisements before the director saw him in a studio and approached him to play the role of the leading male character in the movie Dang Bireley's and Young Gangsters that was historically successful both in terms of revenue and critique. It was regarded as the movie that sparked the popularity and comeback of Thai movies that were in the doldrums.

This was also his birth declaration. After that, he has continued to have his workmanship coming out such as fashion shooting, modeling, films, television dramas/ lakorns, and being a presenter for various brands of products.

Navigator 
Apart from acting, Tik has also been the host and producer of the Navigator with, an ecotourism program on Channel 3 since 2005, and a guest speaker to talk about ecotourism in several academic establishments and organizations all these times. He and his program have received awards from a variety of institutions. Later on in 2014, Jesdaporn Pholdee was conferred an Honorary Degree of Science in environmental science and natural resources Doctorate from Rajamangala University of Technology.

Personal life 
He is married (July 9, 2009).

Filmography

Films

TV Dramas

TV Program Production
 Navigator An award-winning documentary and adventure travel TV program since 2005  that promotes nature conservation, ecotourism, and indigenous knowledge of the locals in spectacular countryside of Thailand.

Awards and achievements
Thailand Blockbuster Entertainment Award - Rising Star Award for Dang Bireley's and Young Gangsters (1997)
Pasurataswadee Award for being a Good Role Model Against Drugs (2000)
Honor Pin (Kemkrat)Award for being a Good Role Model Against Drugs (2001)from PM Gen. Chawalit Yongjaiyuth
Thailand Esquire Award - Man At His Best Award 2001 - Actor Achievement Award by Esquire Magazine
Selected to be the presenter for Thai Tourism between 2002 and 2004
Star Entertainment Awards - Best Actor in the TV Series Tawan Tud Burapa (2002)
Elle Style Awards - Hottest Style of the Year and Best Actor (2002)
Sua Tong Kum (เสื้อทองคำ) Award 2002 - Thai Tailor Association from the Privy Councilor HE Gen. Pichitr Kullavanichaya
Honor Pin received from Princess Ubol Rattana on International Anti-Drug Day June 26, 2002
Petch Siam Awards 2002 from Chandrakasem Rajabhat University, Office of Art & Culture
Sexiest Man of the Year Award: Durex Poll between years 2002 and 2005
Top Award - Best Actor in the TV Series Roy Leh Saneh Rai (2002)
Mekhala Awards 2004 - Best Actor from TV Series Ms jingjai and Mr Sandee
Mekhala Vote Awards 2004 - Most Popular Actor
Top Award - Best Actor in the TV Series Lued Kattiya (2003)
Top Award - Best Actor in the TV Series Nangsao Jingjai Gub Nai Saandee (2004)
Kom Chak Luek Award - Best Actor of 2006 for Kaew Tah Pee TV Series
OK! Magazine Award 2007 - Female Heartthrob
Dusit Poll - Dusit Rajabhat University's Countrywide Survey - Most Favourite Actor in 2001, 2002, 2003 and 2004
ABAC Poll - Assumption University's Countrywide Survey - Most Favourite Actor 2006
The Man whom woman wants to marry with the most Voted Award 2008 – SOHU.COM, China
The Most Popular Actor 2008 – Sudsapda's Young & Smart 2008 Voted Awards
The Hottest Couple - WE Magazine 2009
Green Globe Award 2010 – Media Category, awarded by Petroleum Authority of Thailand (Navigator Program)
SeeSun Bunthueng Awards 2010 - The Best Leading Actor of the Year
The Most Popular Actor 2010 - Sudsapda's Young & Smart 2010 Voted Awards
8th Kom Chad Luk Awards – The Most Popular Actor 2010
TV Pool Top Awards – The Best Actor 2010
25th Golden Television Awards - The Leading Actor of Distinction 2010
4th Rakangthong (Golden Bell) Awards 2011 – awarded by Broadcaster and Journalist's Assembly of Thailand (BJ.AT) for being the role model in social responsibility/ contributions/ good deeds, following the King's footsteps, given by the acting Buddhist Supreme Patriarch (Sangharaja) and H.E. Air Chief Marshal Kamthon Sindhavanon - a Privy Councillor (appointed advisor to His Majesty The King)
 The Most Popular Show Host – Sudsapda's Young & Smart 2011 Voted Awards (from Navigator program)
2012 Phra Kinnaree Award - awarded by Broadcaster and Journalist's Assembly of Thailand (BJ.AT) awarded for being the role model in social responsibility/ contributions/ good deeds, following the King's footsteps, given by His Excellency Kamthon Sindhavanon, the former Air Chief Marshal and currently one of His Majesty's Privy Councillors
 2012 Male Hot Stuff Award – OK! Magazine (Thailand)
 2014 SIAM DARA STARS AWARDS - Best Actor from “Forget Me Not”
 2014 Male Hot Stuff Award – OK! Magazine (Thailand)
 2015 Male Hot Stuff Award - OK! Magazine (Thailand)
 2016 Parent of the Year – “The Best Role Model Parents” - The Pholdees: Tik & Peach, awarded by Amarin Baby & Kids magazine
 2016 Father of the Year – “The Best Role Model Father” awarded by Amarin Baby & Kids magazine
 2016 No. 1 on Suandusitpoll "The Most Famous Actor"

References 

1977 births
Living people
Jesdaporn Pholdee
Jesdaporn Pholdee
Jesdaporn Pholdee
Jesdaporn Pholdee
Jesdaporn Pholdee
Jesdaporn Pholdee
Jesdaporn Pholdee
Jesdaporn Pholdee
Jesdaporn Pholdee
Jesdaporn Pholdee